Jennifer Crupi (born 1973) is an American metalworker known for her unconventional jewelry.

Crupi was born in Red Bank, New Jersey, and has been active in Oceanport as well. A graduate of the Cooper Union and the State University of New York at New Paltz, she creates jewelry that is designed to distort common gestures made by the human body, and which is influenced by traditional human body language. Much of her work uses sterling silver and aluminum in its construction. Crupi was among the artists featured in the exhibit "40 Under 40: Craft Futures" at the Renwick Gallery of the Smithsonian Museum of American Art, and one of her pieces was subsequently accessioned by the museum. She is on the faculty of Kean University.

References

External links
40 under 40: Jennifer Crupi (2012)

1973 births
Living people
American metalsmiths
Women metalsmiths
American jewellers
Cooper Union alumni
State University of New York at New Paltz alumni
Kean University faculty
21st-century American artists
21st-century American women artists
People from Red Bank, New Jersey
Women jewellers